Tatiana Ivanovna Ivanova (born 16 February 1991) is a Russian luger who has competed since 2000. She won the women's singles event at the FIL European Luge Championships in 2010, 2012, 2018 and 2020. Ivanova debuted in the World Cup in the 2008–09 season, finishing 17th.

Career
She competed at her first Olympics in Vancouver, where she finished fourth. The same year Ivanova won the European Championships in Sigulda. Two years later the Russian finished second in the World Championships in Altenberg and successfully defended her title at the European Championships in Paramonovo.

At the 2014 Winter Olympics in Sochi, originally Ivanova, together with Albert Demchenko, Alexander Denisyev, and Vladislav Antonov won the silver medal in the team relay. In December 2017, she was one of eleven Russian athletes who were banned for life from the Olympics by the International Olympic Committee, after doping offences at the 2014 Winter Olympics. Her results at the Olympics were annulled. In January 2018, she successfully appealed against the lifetime ban as well as annulment of result at the court of arbitration for sport.

World Cup podiums

References

External links

1991 births
Living people
People from Chusovoy
Lugers at the 2010 Winter Olympics
Lugers at the 2014 Winter Olympics
Lugers at the 2022 Winter Olympics
Olympic lugers of Russia
Russian female lugers
Doping cases in luge
Russian sportspeople in doping cases
Olympic silver medalists for Russia
Olympic bronze medalists for the Russian Olympic Committee athletes
Olympic medalists in luge
Medalists at the 2014 Winter Olympics
Medalists at the 2022 Winter Olympics
Sportspeople from Perm Krai